Anthony John Mottram (8 June 1920 – 6 October 2016) was a British tennis player of the 1940s and 1950s. Mottram reached the quarterfinal of the 1948 Wimbledon Championships in which he lost to Gardnar Mulloy. In the doubles event he reached the final of the 1947 Wimbledon Championships with Bill Sidwell in which they were defeated by the first-seeded team of Jack Kramer and Bob Falkenburg. He reached the French Open's fourth round in both 1947 and 1948, and the third round of the 1951 US Open.

Mottram was born in Coventry, then Warwickshire (now West Midlands), England. He appeared as a castaway on the BBC Radio programme Desert Island Discs on 14 June 1955. The All England Lawn Tennis Club elected him an Honorary Member in 1957. Mottram died on 6 October 2016 at the age of 96.

Personal life
In 1949 he married Joy Gannon who was also a tennis player, as were their children Buster Mottram and Linda Mottram. In 1957 he published a book with his wife titled Modern Lawn Tennis.

Grand Slam finals

Doubles (1 runner-up)

Bibliography

References 

1920 births
2016 deaths
English male tennis players
British male tennis players
Sportspeople from Coventry
Tennis people from the West Midlands (county)
Professional tennis players before the Open Era